Infanta María Luisa of Spain, Duchess of Talavera de la Reina (née: María Luisa de Silva y Fernández de Henestrosa; 3 December 1880 – 2 April 1955) was a Spanish aristocrat and the second wife of Infante Ferdinand of Spain, Prince of Bavaria, who was a first cousin and (former) brother-in law of Alfonso XIII of Spain. She was the second child and elder daughter of Luis de Silva y Fernandez de Henestrosa, 10th Count of Pie de Concha and his wife, María de los Dolores Fernández de Henestrosa, herself the daughter of the 9th Marquess of Villadarias.

Doña Maria was granted the title "Duchess of Talavera de la Reina", made a grandee of Spain and accorded the style of Highness on 25 June 1914, gazetted 2 September of that year. Doña Maria married Infante Don Fernando de Baviera at Guipúzcoa, Spain on 1 October 1914, whose first wife (and cousin), Infanta Maria Teresa, had died in 1912.

Doña Maria was 56 when, on 17 May 1927, Maria Teresa's brother, King Alfonso XIII, made her an infanta de gracia (by "royal grace") and gave her the elevated treatment of Royal Highness, allowing her to fully share her husband's title and rank: 
"Desiring on this date to give evidence of My Royal esteem to Her Highness the Most Serene Lady Doña María Luisa de Silva y Fernández de Henestrosa, Duchess of Talavera de la Reina, second wife of His Highness Infante Fernando of Bavaria and Bourbon and of My gratitude for the loving disposition with which she has assisted in the education and care of the children of My most beloved sister Infanta María Teresa, I hereby grant upon her the rank, honours and style corresponding to the condition of Infanta of Spain".

Although her husband was a patrilineal descendant of Ludwig I of Bavaria, he had become a naturalised Spaniard in 1905 in conjunction with his first marriage (being the third generation of his cadet branch of the royal House of Wittelsbach to live as modern princes étrangers in Spain).  Four days after Doña Maria de Silva was made a duchess in Spain, her fiancé renounced his dynastic rights as a member of the Bavarian Royal Family, 29 June 1914, completing the transfer of the prince's allegiance from Germany to Spain shortly before the Assassination of Archduke Franz Ferdinand of Austria led to World War I, although the legalities and logistics of the inter-dynastic re-arrangement of assets were disrupted and protracted by the war.

Infante Ferdinand of Spain, Prince of Bavaria and Infanta Maria Luisa, Duchess of Talavera de la Reina had no children.

References

1880 births
1955 deaths
Maria Luisa
Spanish infantas
Spanish duchesses
Nobility from Madrid